KZQQ (1560 AM) is a radio station with a news/talk format licensed to and serving the area around Abilene, Texas. On March 29, 2010, KZQQ dropped the sports format for classic rock. The format flip brought in Dave Andrews for mornings, and Ben “Candy Man” Gonzalez hosting afternoons.

On December 28, 2010 KZQQ changed their format back to sports.

In 2022, Canfin Enterprises reached a deal to sell its Abilene radio cluster to WesTex Telco, LLC, owner of KTJK (101.7 FM).

As of October 1, KZQQ was playing solid gold oldies in advance of a transition to a reworked news-talk format previously found on sister KWKC.

References

External links

News and talk radio stations in the United States
ZQQ
Radio stations established in 1973
1973 establishments in Texas